The Spanish conquest of Sardinia, also known as the Spanish expedition to Sardinia, took place between 22 August 1717 and 30 October 1717. It was the first military action between the Kingdom of Spain and the Holy Roman Empire after the War of the Spanish Succession (1701–1714), and was the direct cause of the War of the Quadruple Alliance (1718–1720). The Spanish troops commanded by the Marquis of Lede and Don José Carrillo de Albornoz, 1st Duke of Montemar, supported by the Spanish fleet, defeated the Emperor's troops easily, and conquered the entire island of Sardinia, which had been ruled by the Emperor since the Treaty of Rastatt (1714), returning it again and for the final time to Spain.

Background 

After the War of the Spanish Succession, with the Treaty of Rastatt, Spain lost all its possessions in Sardinia, Italy and the Low Countries. The Kingdom of Sardinia, the Spanish Netherlands, the Duchy of Milan and the Kingdom of Naples were given to Austria, while Sicily was given to the Duke of Savoy. These territories had been under Spanish rule for nearly two centuries, and their loss was perceived as a great blow to the country in both practical and prestige terms.

In 1717, with the rise of Spain as an important military power again, and the ambitions of King Philip V of Spain to regain Spanish supremacy in Italy and the Mediterranean, the rest of the European powers, Great Britain, France and Austria, to strengthen the Treaty of Utrecht (1713), contemplated ceding Sicily to the Holy Roman Emperor Charles VI, but this arrangement displeased Spain, which wanted to recover the island. With this background, and the arrest in Milan of Spanish Grand Inquisitor Jose Molina by the Austrians, Philip V obtained the pretext he sought. In July, the King of Spain ordered the Spanish fleet, prepared in Barcelona, to conquer Sardinia, initiating hostilities with Austria.

Spanish conquest of Sardinia 
The bulk of the Spanish expedition sailed from the port of Barcelona on July 24;  the rest of the fleet sailed on 30 July. The fleet, under the command of the Marquis de Mari, consisted of nine ships of the line, six frigates, three galleys, two fireships and 80 transport and merchant ships. The army was 8,500 infantry and 500 cavalry commanded by the Marquis of Lede.

On 22 August, the Spanish forces landed in Sardinia, and in just two months reconquered the whole island, whose defenses were commanded by the Marquis of Rubi. The quick victory was mainly due to the psychological action of the Marquis of San Felipe, who toured the island by encouraging the Sardinians, who were not happy with the Austrian dominion, preferring to return under the Spanish rule. Only the strongholds of Alghero and Castellaragonese and the important city of Cagliari resisted. But soon the Austrian troops in Cagliari commanded by Rubi, in the absence of reinforcements, decided to flee to the north of the island, and on 4 October, the Spanish took the city. A few days later, on 19 October, Spanish troops led by Lede and the Duke of Montemar laid siege to Alghero, which capitulated on 25 October. Castellaragonese fell on 30 October, and the Spanish victory was complete.

Consequences 

The initial Austrian reaction to this invasion was limited, because Austria had put all its resources into the Austro-Turkish War of 1716–18, and the Austrian supreme commander, Prince Eugene of Savoy, wanted to avoid a great war in Italy with Spain. The Treaty of Passarowitz ended the war between the Ottoman Empire and Austria, and on 2 August, this led to the formation of the Quadruple Alliance.

Meanwhile, in July 1718, the Spaniards, this time with 30,000 men, including four regiments of Dragoons, again led by the Marquis of Lede, and a fleet of 350 ships, and over 250 pieces of artillery, invaded Sicily. The Spanish forces captured Palermo on 7 July, and then divided their army in two. De Lede followed the coast to besiege Messina between 18 July and 30 September, while the Duke of Montemar conquered the rest of the island.

The French, Austrians, and British demanded that the Spanish withdraw from Sicily and Sardinia. The attitude of Victor Amadeus II of Savoy was ambiguous, as he accepted negotiations with the Spanish Prime Minister, Cardinal Alberoni, to form an anti-Austrian alliance. At the conclusion of this war, Spain would relinquish Sardinia under the terms of the Treaty of The Hague.

See also 
Isabella Farnese
List of viceroys of Sardinia
List of viceroys of Sicily
Triple Alliance

References

Bibliography 
 Fernández Duro, Cesáreo. Armada Española desde la unión de los reinos de Castilla y Aragón. Vol/VI. Museo Naval. Madrid (1973)
 Martínez Laínez, Fernando/Canales, Carlos. Banderas Lejanas. Ed. EDAF (2009) 
 Alonso Aguilera, Miguel Ángel. La Conquista y el dominio español de Cerdeña 1717-1720. Universidad de Valladolid (1977)
 Lafuente, Modesto. Historia General de España (Volume IX) Madrid (1862)
Chandler, David G. The Art of Warfare in the Age of Marlborough. Spellmount Limited (1990) 
 Suárez Fernández, Luis. Historia general de España y América: La España de las reformas: Hasta el final del reinado de Carlos IV. (1984) 

1717 in Europe
Sardinia
Battles involving Austria
Battles involving the Holy Roman Empire
Conflicts in 1717
History of Sardinia
1717 in Spain
Sardinia